The Mari language is a Uralic language spoken in parts of Russia. 

Mari language may also mean: 

Mari language (Madang Province), an Austronesian language of Papua New Guinea
Mari language (Sepik), a Papuan language of Papua New Guinea
Mari, or Namo, one of the Nambu languages of Papua New Guinea
One of the Maric languages of Australia

See also 
, for the languages spoken in the ancient Near Eastern city of Mari